Thomas Robert "Savage Tom" Thomas (December 27, 1873 – September 23, 1942) was a pitcher in Major League Baseball. He played for the Cleveland Spiders and St. Louis Perfectos/Cardinals.

References

External links

1873 births
1942 deaths
Major League Baseball pitchers
Cleveland Spiders players
St. Louis Perfectos players
St. Louis Cardinals players
Baseball players from Ohio
19th-century baseball players
Peoria Distillers players
Detroit Tigers (Western League) players
Kansas City Blues (baseball) players
Chicago White Stockings (minor league) players
St. Paul Saints (Western League) players
Minneapolis Millers (baseball) players
Milwaukee Brewers (minor league) players
Columbus Senators players
Terre Haute Hottentots players
Anderson (minor league baseball) players
Grand Rapids Orphans players
Youngstown Ohio Works players
People from Shawnee, Perry County, Ohio